Liu Pi (216–154 BC) was a nephew of Emperor Gao of Han, son of Liu Xi, Prince of Dai, and appointed Prince of Wu by Emperor Gao.  During the reign of Emperor Jing, he initiated the Rebellion of the Seven States to resist the Emperor's centralizing policies, during which he was defeated and killed.

Biography
In 196 BC, he was made Marquess of Pei at the age of 20.  He demonstrated his combat ability as a cavalry general in the campaign against Ying Bu. On 30 November 196 BC, Emperor Gao promoted Liu Pi to Prince of Wu due to his growing concerns about the Wu provinces.

When Emperor Wen of Han was on the throne, Liu Pi's son Liu Xian and Crown Prince Qi (later Emperor Jing of Han) were involved in a game of Liubo which ended in the crown prince accidentally killing Liu Pi's son with the chess board.  Out of revenge and reflecting his growing distrust of the Emperor, Liu Pi started building up his wealth and military power within his territory. Emperor Wen believed his son was at fault for Liu Xian's death and did not hold Liu Pi accountable for his aggressive actions.

After Crown Prince Qi ascended to the throne and became Emperor Jing of Han, based on the advice from Chao Cuo, Emperor Jing began to centralize power in an attempt to reduce the strength of the regional princes.  In 154 BC, Liu Pi convinced six other princes to rebel against the emperor, thereby starting the Rebellion of the Seven States.  The emperor appointed Zhou Yafu as commander and he defeated Liu Pi's army.  Liu Pi was killed during the battle and his title was abolished.

References

216 BC births
154 BC deaths
Han dynasty imperial princes
Han dynasty generals
Han dynasty rebels